The Argentine Constitutional Reforms of 1949 were approved during Juan Domingo Perón's government.
This new constitution was a major revision of the Constitution of Argentina. Its goal was to modernize and adapt the text to the twentieth century's concepts of democracy, with a bill of social rights, including better working conditions for the working class, right to education, etc. It also allowed for the indefinite reelection of the president.

It was suppressed by the military and civilian uprising known as Revolución Libertadora.

Constitutionalists 
 Arturo Sampay, considered the "father of the Constitution of 1949"
 Domingo Mercante
 José Espejo
 Ítalo Luder
 Pablo A. Ramella
 Eduardo Colom
 Moisés Lebensohn
 A. Aráoz de Lamadrid
 Alfredo D. Calcagno
 R. Lascano

Bibliography

References

External links

 SABSAY, Daniel; Constitución y poder, 2004
 English translation of the amended 1949 Constitution (as appearing in British and Foreign State Papers, vol. 155, part 3

Constitutions of Argentina
History of Argentina (1943–1955)
1949 in Argentina
1949 in law
1949 documents